Kenneth Colin Brangwin (11 June 1907 – 25 May 1983) was an English sprinter who competed in the 1930 British Empire Games.

At 1930 Empire Games he won the gold medal with the English team in the 4×440 yards relay event and in the 440 yards competition he finished fourth.

External links
Profile at TOPS in athletics

1907 births
1983 deaths
English male sprinters
Athletes (track and field) at the 1930 British Empire Games
Commonwealth Games gold medallists for England
Commonwealth Games medallists in athletics
Medallists at the 1930 British Empire Games